Sharafat is a 1970 Hindi romantic drama film, directed by Asit Sen, starring Ashok Kumar, Dharmendra, Hema Malini in lead roles. Hema Malini plays the role of a feisty courtesan Chanda in search of her father, in this satire about society's hypocritical moral standards.  The screenplay was written by Nabendu Ghosh, while the dialogues were by Hindi satirist Krishan Chander (author of such dark classics of Black Humor & Satire as Ek Gadhe Ki Aatmkatha (An Autobiography Of A Donkey).

The film with music by Laxmikant–Pyarelal and lyrics by Anand Bakshi, was also noted for its mujra dance song, Sharafat Chhor Di sung by Lata Mangeshkar, which reached 9th position on the Binaca Geetmala annual list 1970.

Cast
 Ashok Kumar as Jagatram
 Dharmendra as Rajesh
 Hema Malini as Chandni
 Sonia Sahni as Rekha
 Jagdeep as Bhola
 Shabnam as Rani
 Abhi Bhattacharya as Gopinath
 Kanhaiyalal as Pratapchand
 D.K. Sapru as Jamnaprasad
 Jankidas as Jeweller
 Tun Tun as Champakali
 Mohan Choti as Student
 Paro Devi as Kesarbai
 Raj Kishore as student
 Birbal as student
 Purnima as Chandni's Mother
 Roopesh Kumar as Arun
 Sunder as Gopal
 Brahma Bharadwaj as Principal
 Keshav Rana as Ruffian at the brothel

Soundtrack
The film had music by Laxmikant–Pyarelal and lyrics by Anand Bakshi.

References

External links
 
 
 Sharafat Review

1970 films
1970s Hindi-language films
Films about courtesans in India
Films scored by Laxmikant–Pyarelal